The Avenue of Stars was a version of the Hollywood Walk of Fame in London, England. It opened in 2005 with one hundred names, and was a temporary installation to accompany a TV show to celebrate ITV's 50th birthday. The Avenue of Stars was a walkway through Covent Garden passing St Paul's Church, commonly known as the "Actors' Church". It honoured individuals or groups from the entertainment industry with notable achievements. As on the Hollywood Walk of Fame, the individual or group was represented by a five-pointed star containing the name set into the walkway. To qualify for a star, the individual or group had to have been from the United Kingdom, the Republic of Ireland, or a Commonwealth nation.

The first inductee onto the Avenue of Stars was Jimmy Page, guitarist with Led Zeppelin. In 2006, all of the stars were removed, due to rapid deterioration and only the old flagstones are visible in the courtyard. American singer/songwriter Is'real Benton formed a U.S.-based eponymous foundation to restore the Walk of Fame.

List of stars on the London Avenue of Stars

See also
 Culture of London

References

2005 establishments in England
2006 disestablishments in England
London, Avenue of Stars
Covent Garden
Entertainment halls of fame
Defunct tourist attractions in London